For Love or Money is an Australian antiques television program that premiered on ABC Television in 1987, and aired through 1989. Clive Hale was the host and there were various panelists, including Peter Cook, who appraised antiques sent in by viewers. The episodes were filmed in various historic locations and featured a special guest showing a prized personal procession of their own.

References

1987 Australian television series debuts
1989 Australian television series endings
Australian Broadcasting Corporation original programming
1980s Australian documentary television series
Australian non-fiction television series
Antiques television series